Miniature Machine Corporation (MMC) is a Nevada based corporation specializing in the design and manufacture of tactical weapons and weapon accessories.

Founded in 1959, the company is best known for their line of adjustable tactical sights used by military and law enforcement agencies throughout the world. The company also has purchased the inventory and patents of New Mexico-based Innovative Weaponry, Inc., including their PT Night Sights, a 1986 registered brand of tritium filled fixed tactical sights for application on semi-auto pistols, revolvers, rifles, and shotguns. The company has administrative and manufacturing facilities in the Las Vegas, Nevada.

Notes

Companies based in Enterprise, Nevada
Firearm manufacturers of the United States
Firearm sights